The Farza District is a new district of Kabul Province, Afghanistan, with a population of 18,000 people. Farza is one of the greenest districts of Kabul. Two hundred years ago the people of Farza had a kingdom lifestyle. The center of Farza is called Qala Mera, which was made by Sayed Baabshah. Sayed's people had strong rules and they were peaceful people.

According to the UNHCR, in 2002, the population consisted of a mixture of Pashtuns and Tajiks. In January 1991, Farza was separated as an independent district from Mir Bacha Kot District but this structure was never recognized by the Taliban government. The district headquarters is Dehnawe Farza. Farza district contains eighteen villages. Agriculture is the primary source of income.

References 

Districts of Kabul Province